For people with the surname, see Badalucco (surname).

Badalucco borders the following municipalities: Bajardo, Ceriana, Dolcedo, Molini di Triora, Montalto Ligure, and Taggia.

References

Cities and towns in Liguria